The Black Monk is a 1988 Soviet drama film directed by Ivan Dykhovichny.

Plot 
The film tells about a philosopher named Andrei Kovrin, who goes to a village where he meets Tatyana, who will immediately fall in love.

Cast 
 Stanislav Lyubshin as Korvin
 Tatyana Drubich as Tania
 Pyotr Fomenko as Tania's Father
 Lyubov Selyutina	
 Viktor Shternberg
 Yelena Boguslavskaya as Yelena Boguslavskaya

References

External links 
 

1988 films
1980s Russian-language films
Soviet drama films
German drama films
West German films
Films based on works by Anton Chekhov
1988 drama films
1980s German films